Center is a village in, and county seat of, Knox County, Nebraska, United States. The population was 73 at the 2020 census.

History
Center was platted in 1901. It was named from its location near the geographical center of Knox County. Center was incorporated as a village in 1904.

Geography
Center is located at  (42.608910, -97.876224).  Bazile Creek passes through the outskirts of the village.

Center lies at the junction of Nebraska Highway 84, which runs east and west, and Nebraska Highway 13, the northern terminus of which is at Center. There is no railroad through the village, and no airport.

Demographics

2010 census
As of the census of 2010, there were 94 people, 39 households, and 25 families living in the village. The racial makeup of the village was 88.3% White, 6.4% Native American, 1.1% from other races, and 4.3% from two or more races. Hispanic or Latino of any race were 6.4% of the population.

There were 39 households, of which 23.1% had children under the age of 18 living with them, 51.3% were married couples living together, 7.7% had a female householder with no husband present, 5.1% had a male householder with no wife present, and 35.9% were non-families. 30.8% of all households were made up of individuals, and 18% had someone living alone who was 65 years of age or older. The average household size was 2.26 and the average family size was 2.88.

The median age in the village was 49.5 years. 23.4% of residents were under the age of 18; 5.3% were between the ages of 18 and 24; 16% were from 25 to 44; 35.1% were from 45 to 64; and 20.2% were 65 years of age or older. The gender makeup of the village was 54.3% male and 45.7% female.

2000 census
As of the census of 2000, there were 90 people, 43 households, and 23 families living in the village. The population density was 840.0 people per square mile (315.9/km2). There were 49 housing units at an average density of 457.4 per square mile (172.0/km2). The racial makeup of the village was 95.56% White, 4.44% from other races. Hispanic or Latino of any race were 8.89% of the population.

There were 43 households, out of which 23.3% had children under the age of 18 living with them, 51.2% were married couples living together, and 44.2% were non-families. 41.9% of all households were made up of individuals, and 25.6% had someone living alone who was 65 years of age or older. The average household size was 2.09 and the average family size was 2.92.

In the village, the population was spread out, with 24.4% under the age of 18, 5.6% from 18 to 24, 20.0% from 25 to 44, 24.4% from 45 to 64, and 25.6% who were 65 years of age or older. The median age was 46 years. For every 100 females, there were 104.5 males. For every 100 females age 18 and over, there were 106.1 males.

As of 2000 the median income for a household in the village was $24,643, and the median income for a family was $31,500. Males had a median income of $26,250 versus $23,750 for females. The per capita income for the village was $12,277. There were 6.7% of families and 6.5% of the population living below the poverty line, including none of those under 18 and 20.7% of those over 64.

In Media
Center was mentioned in a trending YouTube video by Brian David Gilbert uploaded on October 25, 2020.

References

External links 

 

Villages in Knox County, Nebraska
Villages in Nebraska
County seats in Nebraska